San Vicente de la Sonsierra is a village in the province and autonomous community of La Rioja, Spain.

Demographics

Population centres
 San Vicente de la Sonsierra
 Rivas de Tereso
 Peciña
 Pangua
 Orzales
 Doroño

Places of interest

Religious Buildings
 Hermitage of Santa María de La Piscina

References

Populated places in La Rioja (Spain)